Pletzel, platzel or pletzl (cookie or cracker) is a type of Jewish flatbread similar to focaccia.

Overview
A type of pletzel smothered in onion and poppy seeds is known as the onion pletzl, onion board or onion flat in the US. It was a common treat sold in American Jewish bakeries until the end of the 20th century. In east London and in Buenos Aires, the onion platzel is still available.

See also
 Pletzl, from Middle High German ple(t)zel, "little square", is also the name of the center of the former Jewish quarter in Paris, France.
 Cebularz
 Bialy
 Bagel
 List of Jewish cuisine dishes

References

External links
 Joan Nathan: “Lights of Life, and Food of Memory”. The New York Times, November 26, 2010

Ashkenazi Jewish cuisine
Crackers (food)
Flatbreads
Jewish American cuisine
Jewish breads